The Qingdao International Beer Festival is a yearly festival held in Qingdao in Shandong province, China. The event is jointly sponsored by national state ministries and the Qingdao Municipal Government.

History

First held in 1991 to celebrate the town's hundredth anniversary, festivals feature artistic parades, "Beer Carnival" games, beer tasting, drinking contests, music, food, interactive performances, various brewery beer tents, trade exhibitions, gala performances, carnival amusement park games and rides, and even bikini model contests.

Every year, the festival starts at the second weekend of August and lasts for 16 days.

Highlights

The festival is held at multiple locations throughout the city. In 2015, a 66.6-hectare site was constructed containing beer tents and stalls selling sauerkraut, bratwurst and beer in plastic carrier bags (a festival tradition) as well as Bavarian band music, mass drinking competitions, Peking opera performances and karaoke.

References

External links
Tsingtao Beer web site for US
Tsingdao Brewery main website

Festivals in China
Beer festivals in China
Tourist attractions in Qingdao
Annual events in China
Summer events in China